Black Country Rock Media is an American independent multi-format record label owned by Shooter Jennings. Black Country Rock began in 2010 as a brand label for Shooter Jennings 2010 album Black Ribbons and evolved into a full record label with offices in Nashville, Tennessee and Los Angeles, California.

Black Country Rock media's official mission statement is that "BCR does not discriminate against formats and will release music, film and other creative projects by way of vinyl, compact disc, cassette tape, digital download, DVD, VHS and more. BCR fearlessly embraces and supports both the continuing accessibility of the technology of the present and also the preservation of tangible goods, no matter their age or obscurity."

History
In October 2013 Jennings announced the formation of his new label and multi-format recording company, Black County Rock. Their initial releases included: A remastered releases of the Waylon Jennings album Right for the Time, two live albums, one from Jessi Colter titled Live from Cain's Ballroom, and one from Shooter Jennings titled The Other Live, as well as a recording of "You Are My Sunshine" featuring vocals from both Jamey Johnson and Shooter Jennings. All four were released in Vinyl, cassette, Cd, as well as digitally.

BCR concerts
Black Country Rock Media hosts concert nights called BCR Days or BCR Nights. The concerts usually feature Shooter among other artists both on the Black Country Rock Label such as Jessi Colter and off such as Billy Ray Cyrus. These concerts are typically for now held in the greater Los Angeles area.

Artists
 Shooter Jennings
 Jessi Colter
 Bad Mothers
 IV and the Strange Band

References

Record labels based in Nashville, Tennessee
Record labels established in 2013
American independent record labels
Companies based in Los Angeles